The Noida Electronic City is a metro station on the Blue Line extension of the Delhi Metro, in the city of Noida in India. It lies on the east extreme end of Blue Line extension of the Delhi Metro. It is surrounded by several software companies and the institute Jaypee Institute Of Information Technology.
It serves the sub-cities of Indirapuram and Noida.

History
Construction work began in 2015 and was completed by March 2019. Prime Minister Narendra Modi inaugurated the section on 9 March 2019.

Station

Station layout

Facilities
DMRC Car Parking

Entry/Exit

Connections

Bus

See also

Delhi
Noida
List of Delhi Metro stations
Transport in Delhi
Delhi Metro Rail Corporation
Delhi Suburban Railway
Delhi Monorail
Delhi Transport Corporation
South East Delhi
New Delhi
National Capital Region (India)
Noida–Greater Noida Expressway
Noida Metro
List of rapid transit systems
List of metro systems

References

External links

 Delhi Metro Rail Corporation Ltd. (Official site) 
 Delhi Metro Annual Reports
 
 UrbanRail.Net – Descriptions of all metro systems in the world, each with a schematic map showing all stations.

Delhi Metro stations
Railway stations in Gautam Buddh Nagar district
Transport in Noida